The Paddington Ward (formerly Toowong Ward) is a Brisbane City Council ward covering Paddington, Auchenflower, Kelvin Grove, Milton, Petrie Terrace, Red Hill, and parts of Bardon and Toowong.

History 
Toowong Ward was created in 1994 as a merger of Liberal-held Taringa Ward and Labor-held Paddington Ward. Liberal councillor Judy Magub was elected in 1994 and re-elected in 1997, 2000 and 2004, before retiring in 2007. Liberal councillor Peter Matic was appointed to the casual vacancy, and was re-elected in 2008. The ward was renamed Paddington Ward prior to the 2016 election after shifting to the north and east, and losing parts of Toowong to Walter Taylor Ward.

Councillors for Paddington Ward

Results

References 

City of Brisbane wards